This article concerns the period 609 BC – 600 BC.

Events and trends
609 BC—The Babylonians defeat the Assyrian army of Ashur-uballit II and capture Harran. Ashur-uballit, the last Assyrian king, disappears from history.
609 BC—Battle of Megiddo: King Josiah of Judah dies in battle against Pharaoh Necho II of Egypt, who is on his way north to aid the Assyrian state of Ashur-uballit II. Jehoahaz succeeds his father Josiah as King of Judah, but is quickly deposed by Necho, who installs Jehoahaz's brother Jehoiakim in his place.
607 BC (15–26 March)—Halley's Comet is visible from Earth.
606 BC—Ji Yu succeeds Zhou Kuang Wang as king of the Zhou Dynasty in China.
605 BC—Battle of Carchemish: Crown Prince Nebuchadnezzar II of Babylon defeats the army of Necho II of Egypt, securing the Babylonian conquest of Assyria. The Babylonians pursue through Syria and Palestine.
605 BC—Battle of Hamath: Nebuchadnezzar II defeats the remainder of the Egyptian army following the Battle of Carchemish.
605 BC—Nebuchadnezzar II succeeds his father Nabopolassar as King of Babylon.
601 BC—Foundation of Perinthus by settlers from Samos (traditional date).
601 BC—The Jewish–Babylonian war begins between the Kingdom of Judah and Babylonia.
600 BC—Marseille is founded by Greeks of Phocaea, who are victorious over the Carthaginians in a naval battle, beginning the Greco–Punic Wars.
600 BC—The Satrapy of Armenia is created.
600 BC—Capua is founded.
600 BC—Smyrna is sacked and destroyed by Alyattes of Lydia.
600 BC—Nebuchadnezzar II builds the Hanging Gardens of Babylon.
c. 600 BC—Milan is founded by Celts.
c. 600 BC—Pompeii is founded.
c. 600 BC—The Etruscans capture the settlement of Rome, making it into a prosperous trading centre.
c. 600 BC—Zarathustra's religion becomes popular in Persia.
c. 600 BC—Radiocarbon dating for first circular inhabitation enclosure at Emain Macha.
c. 600 BC—580 BC—Construction begins on the Temple of Artemis, Korkyra (Corfu).
c. 600 BC—Construction begins on the largest mound at Cahokia. Construction continues until AD 200.
c. 600 BC—The Archaic period of sculpture begins in Ancient Greece.
c. 600 BC—Pitcher (container) (olpe), from Corinth, is made.
c. 600 BC—Kouros sculptures begin to be made.
c. 600 BC—The Doric and Ionic orders are well developed.
c. 600 BC—500 BC—A calendrical system appears in areas with strong Olmec influence in Mesoamerica.

Significant people
608 BC—Birth of Peisistratus, ruler of Athens
607 BC—Death of King Kuang of the Zhou Dynasty of China
605 BC—Death of Nabopolassar, first ruler of the Neo-Babylonian Empire
c. 600 BC—Birth of King Cambyses I of Anshan, head of the Achaemenid dynasty

References